Korean studies is an academic discipline that focuses on the study of Korea, which includes the Republic of Korea, the Democratic People's Republic of Korea, and diasporic Korean populations. Areas commonly included under this rubric include Korean history, Korean culture, Korean literature, Korean art, Korean music, Korean language and linguistics, Korean sociology and anthropology, Korean politics, Korean economics, Korean folklore, Korean ethnomusicology and increasingly study of Korean popular culture. It may be compared to other area studies disciplines, such as American studies and Chinese studies. Korean studies is sometimes included within a broader regional area of focus including "East Asian studies".

The term Korean studies first began to be used in the 1940s, but did not attain widespread currency until South Korea rose to economic prominence in the 1970s. In 1991, the South Korean government established the Korea Foundation to promote Korean studies around the world.

Korean studies was originally an area of study conceived of and defined by non-Koreans. Korean scholars of Korea tend to see themselves as linguists, sociologists, and historians, but not as "Koreanists" unless they have received at least some of their education outside Korea and are academically active (for example publishing and attending conferences)in languages other than Korean (most Korean studies publications are in English but there is also a significant amount of Korean Studies activity in other European languages), or work outside Korean academia. In the mid-2000s, Korean universities pushing for more classes taught in English began to hire foreign-trained Koreanists of Korean and non-Korean origin to teach classes. This was often geared towards foreigners in Korean graduate schools. There are now graduate school programs in Korean Studies (mostly active at the MA level) in most of the major Korean universities. BA programs in Korean Studies have now been opened at two Korean universities. The BA programs are distinctive in that they have few foreign students.

 The Academy of Korean Studies (한국학중앙연구원, AKS) est.1978
 The Korea Research Foundation (한국학술진흥재단, KRF) est.1981
 The Korea Foundation (한국국제교류재단) est.1991.
 The Advanced Center for Korean Studies (한국국학진흥원, ACKS) est.1995.

Debates in the Field
What exactly Korean Studies is, who is teaching it, who is learning, and what should be taught continues to be debated.

There has been a small series of works debating Korean Studies published in academic journals. A sort of historical overview by Charles Armstrong titled "Development and Directions of Korean Studies in the United States" comes strongly from Armstrong's perspective teaching history at Columbia University, as his work: "Focusing on the discipline of history, ... traces the emergence of Korean Studies in the 1950s, the evolution of the field and the changing backgrounds of American scholars working on Korea in the 1960s to 1980s, and the rapid growth of Korean Studies since the early 1990s." Another historian, Andre Schmid published an early contribution to the debate in 2008, challenging the ways that English academia was pushing or shaping the directions of Korean Studies. Schmid explained, "In the unequal global cultural arena where English still dominates, the direction of Korean Studies in the United States disproportionately shapes international representations of Korean culture." University of Berkeley Sociologist John Lie contributed two pieces to the debate, the more recent of which challenged the Korean Studies, claiming "senior Koreanists seem rather content with their progress, telling their followers bizarre tales from the field and seeking to reproduce the archaic and mistaken Harvard East Asia paradigm." Lie discusses the weaknesses he sees in this paradigm for the remainder of the essay. In 2018 CedarBough T Saeji published an article in Acta Koreana bringing in the perspective of teaching Korean Studies in Korea, focusing on "1) the struggle to escape the nation-state boundaries implied in the habitual terminology, particularly when teaching in the ROK, where the country is unmarked (한국,“Han’guk”), the Democratic People's Republic of Korea is marked (북한,“Pukhan”), and the diaspora is rarely mentioned at all; 2) the implications of the expansion of Korean Studies as a major within the ROK; 3) in-class navigations of Korean national pride, the trap of Korean uniqueness and (self-)orientalization and attitudes toward the West."

Notable centers of Korean studies outside Korea
A-Z order
Beijing Foreign Studies University — School of Asian and African Studies
Cornell University - School of East Asian Studies
Curtin University, Korea Research Centre of Western Australia
Freie Universität Berlin - Institute of Korean Studies
George Washington University — GW Institute for Korean Studies (GWIKS) 
Institute of Oriental Studies of the Russian Academy of Sciences - Department of Korean and Mongolian Studies 
University of British Columbia - Centre for Korean Studies
University of California, Berkeley — Center for Korean Studies
University of California, Los Angeles — Center for Korean Studies
 Le Centre de Recherches sur la Corée (CRC ou « Centre Corée ») de l’EHESS
University of Chicago — Center for East Asian Studies
Columbia University — Center for Korean Research
Harvard University — Korea Institute
University of Hawaii — Center for Korean Studies
Indiana University - East Asian Studies CenterInstitute for Korean Studies
Indiana University Bloomington - Center for Korean Studies
University of Leeds - Korea Research Hub, UK, Leeds
Universiteit Leiden — Korean Studies
Katholieke Universiteit Leuven (University of Leuven, KU Leuven)- Center for Korean Studies
University of London School of Oriental and African Studies — Centre of Korean Studies
Far Eastern Federal University — Oriental Institute - School of Regional and International Studies
Novosibirsk State Technical University — Faculty of Humanities - International Affairs and Regional Studies (
University of Michigan — Nam Center for Korean Studies
National Museum of Ethnology (Japan)
Ohio State University
University of Pennsylvania — James Joo-Jin Kim Program in Korean Studies
University of Sheffield — School of East Asian Studies
University of Central Lancashire — International Institute of Korean Studies
Tenri University — Department of Foreign Languages
Tufts University, The Fletcher School of Law and Diplomacy — Chair of Korean Studies
University of Tokyo — Department of Korean Studies
University of Toronto — Centre for the Study of Korea
Vietnam National University, Ho Chi Minh City — Faculty of Korean Studies, University of Social Sciences and Humanities
Vrije Universiteit Brussel, Institute for European Studies — KF-VUB Korea Chair
University of Washington - Korea Studies Program, East Asia Studies, Henry M. Jackson School of International Studies
The University of Western Australia
Yale University — East Rock Institute

Korean Studies Programs in Korea
A-Z order
Academy of Korean Studies - this is only a graduate school with no undergraduate program 
Dong-A University - Graduate School of International Studies
Ewha Womans University - B.A. degree program (Scranton College, Division of International Studies, Department of Korean Studies) and M.A. degree program (Graduate School of International Studies, Department of Korean Studies)
Hankuk University of Foreign Studies — Undergraduate program and Graduate program
Hanyang University - Graduate School of International Studies
Korea University - Graduate School of International Studies
Pusan National University - Graduate School of International Studies
Silla University — Study in korea
Sangmyung University - The Graduate School, Division of Humanities and Social sciences, Department of Korean Studies
Seoul National University - Graduate School of International Studies
Sogang University - Undergraduate and Graduate program of the School of Integrated Knowledge(Global Korean Studies) and Graduate program(Graduate School of International Studies)
Yonsei University - Graduate School of International Studies

Academic Journals
The Journal of Korean Studies (JKS) has just moved to George Washington University after stints at University of Washington and Columbia.
Korean Studies (KS) University of Hawaii.
Korea Journal Formerly published by the Korean National Commission for UNESCO, Seoul, South Korea, this journal is now published by the Academy of Korean Studies.
Acta Koreana Keimyung University, Daegu.
Chosen Gakuho: Journal of the Academic Association of Koreanology in Japan, Tenri University.
Korean Culture and Society, Association for the Study of Korean Culture and Society.
Routledge Research on Korea Series.
Korean and Korean American Studies Bulletin (KKASB). East Rock Institute

Associations for Korean Studies overseas
 Academic Association of Koreanology in Japan
 The Association for Korean Studies in Europe (AKSE)
 Association for the Study of Korean Culture and Society (Japan)
 British Association for Korean Studies (BAKS)
 Committee on Korean Studies of the Association for Asian Studies (CKS)
 Korean Studies Association of Australasia (KSAA)

Koreanists
The term Koreanist generally indicates an academic scholar of Korean language, history, culture, society, music, art, literature, film, or any other subject who primarily publishes in a Western language. All such Koreanists are fluent in Korean and various other relevant research languages.

Koreanists who have published at least one Western-language academic book include:
Archeology: Gina Barnes, Mark E. Byington, Hyung Il Pai.
Cinema: Andrew David Jackson, Kyung Hyun Kim.
Early Koreanists: James Scarth Gale, William E. Skillend, Richard Rutt. 
Fine arts: Burglind Jungmann, Maya K. H. Stiller.
Folklore, anthropology, and sociology: Hesung Chun Koh, Nancy Abelmann, Chungmoo Choi, Martina Deuchler, Stephen Epstein, Joanna Elfving-Hwang, Roger Janelli, Laurel Kendall, John Lie, Shimpei Cole Ota, Hyung Il Pai, Mutsuhiko Shima, Gi-Wook Shin.
History: Remco E. Breuker, Mark E. Byington, Mark E. Caprio, Yong-ho Ch'oe, Bruce Cumings, John B. Duncan, Carter J. Eckert, Kyung Moon Hwang, Andrew David Jackson, Hugh H. W. Kang, Anders Karlsson, Nan Kim, Kirk W. Larsen, Namhee Lee, James B. Lewis, Christopher Lovins, Yumi Moon, James B. Palais, N. M. Pankaj, Eugene Y. Park, Mark A. Peterson, Kenneth R. Robinson, Michael Robinson, Edward J. Shultz, Felix Siegmund, Vladimir Tikhonov, Edward W. Wagner.
International relations: Victor D. Cha, Stephan Haggard, David C. Kang, Sung-Yoon Lee.
International Law: Kwang Lim Koh
Language and literature: Yang Hi Choe-Wall, Kyeong-Hee Choi, Marion Eggert, Gregory N. Evon, Bruce Fulton, JaHyun Kim Haboush, Christopher Hanscom, Ross King, Peter H. Lee, David R. McCann, Michael J. Pettid, Marshall Pihl, Youngjoo Ryu, Serk-Bae Suh, Brother Anthony of Taize.
North Korea: Charles K. Armstrong, Suzy Kim, Andrei Lankov, Nina Špitálníková.
Performing arts: Keith Howard, Hwang Byungki, Lee Byongwon, Lee Duhyon, Lee Hye-ku, Roald Maliangkay, CedarBough T. Saeji.
Philosophy and religion: Juhn Y. Ahn, Don Baker, Robert Buswell Jr., Donald N. Clark, James H. Grayson, Michael Kalton, Daeyeol Kim, Hwansoo Ilmee Kim, N. M. Pankaj, Jin Y. Park, Franklin D. Rausch, Isabelle Sancho, Sem Vermeersch, Boudewijn Walraven.

See also

 Korean Wave (Koreanophile) (Koreaboo)
 List of academic disciplines
 North Korean studies

References

Further reading

Library guides

External links
The Korea Foundation, Seoul 한국국제교류재단
krf.or.kr, The Korea Research Foundation 한국학술진흥재단
Academy of Korean Studies, Seoul and Korean Studies Net. 한국학중앙연구원
Korean Studies Portal 한국학 포털 (Frank Hoffmann)
Yuldo.net: A Korean Studies Site
 Seoul National University Kyujanggak Institute for Korean Studies official website
Silla University oia Busan Office of International Affairs of Silla University
 Kyujanggak Archive Search

 
Korean culture